Neutral fats, also known as true fats, are simple lipids that are produced by the dehydration synthesis of one or more fatty acids with an alcohol like glycerol. Many types of neutral fats are possible both because of the number and variety of fatty acids that could form part of it and because of the different bonding locations for the fatty acids. An example is a monoglyceride, which has one fatty acid combined with glycerol, a diglyceride, which has two fatty acids combined with glycerol, or a triglyceride, which has three fatty acids combined with glycerol.

Triglycerides 
Triglycerides are formed from the esterification of 3 molecules of fatty acids with one molecule of trihydric alcohol, glycerol (glycerine or trihydroxy propane). In the process, 3 molecules of water are eliminated. The word "triglyceride" refers to the number of fatty acids esterified to one molecule of glycerol.

In triglycerides, the three fatty acids are rarely similar and are thus called pure fats. For example, tripalmitin, tristearin, etc.

Sources
 Biology 12: a student resource, R. Prior.

Tissues (biology)